Anolis longitibialis, the Barahona stout anole or Isla Beata anole, is a species of lizard in the family Dactyloidae. The species is found in the Dominican Republic.

References

Anoles
Reptiles described in 1923
Endemic fauna of the Dominican Republic
Reptiles of the Dominican Republic
Taxa named by Gladwyn Kingsley Noble